INS Andamans is a . These large multi-role troop ships were converted from merchant ships which were originally ordered by the Ministry of Shipping for service with the Shipping Corporation of India that were later acquired by the Indian Navy for troop transport duties. The ship has large davits for Landing Craft Vehicle Personnel (LCVP) and also features a high bridge forward, funnel in the aft, and a helicopter platform at the stern. This makes the vessel suitable for general purpose roles, other than just troop transport.

References

Troop ships of India
1990 ships